Lauben may refer to:

Lauben, a municipality in the district of Oberallgäu in Bavaria.
Lauben, Unterallgäu, a municipality in the district of Unterallgäu in Bavaria.
Lubań, a town in Lower Silesia.